This is a list of New Zealand television events and premieres which occurred, or are scheduled to occur, in 2010, the 50th year of continuous operation of television in New Zealand.

Premieres

Domestic series

International series

Specials

Programming changes

Programmes ending in 2010

References